The 1930–31 Serie A season was the fifth season of the Serie A, the top level of ice hockey in Italy. Six teams participated in the league, and Hockey Club Milano won the championship by defeating GSD Cortina in the final.

Regular season

Group A

Group B

3rd place 
 Hockey Club Milano II - HC Gherdëina 3:1

Final
Hockey Club Milano - GSD Cortina 6:1

External links
 Season on hockeytime.net

1930–31 in Italian ice hockey
Serie A (ice hockey) seasons
Italy